The Kephalaia Gnostika (meaning Chapters on Knowledge, or Propositions on Knowledge) is a 4th-century work by Evagrius Ponticus. It is philosophical in nature, containing many themes on cosmology and metaphysics, and resembles the Neoplatonic Enneads in many ways.

Structure
The Kephalia Gnostika has 6 books, each with 90 propositions (or "chapters").

Manuscripts
Although most, but not all, of the original Greek text has been lost, there is a Syriac manuscript in the British Museum that contains many clear Origenist theories which had been denounced at the Council of Constantinople in 553. This version is typically referred to as the Syriac S2 version. The other Syriac version, known as the Syriac S1 version, had been expurgated, with the more obvious Origenist content censured. For instance, the original Kephalaia Gnostika contains content about cosmic restoration and reintegration of all things into God (apokatastasis).

Translations
There is a French translation and critical edition by Antoine Guillaumont (1958) and a more recent English translation by Ilaria L. E. Ramelli (2015). A Slovenian translation was published in 2015.

As the Kephalaia Gnostika is often difficult to interpret, scholars often rely on other writings such as Evagrius' lengthy Letter to Melania to help interpret the text.

Creation account

In the cosmology of the Kephalaia Gnostika, there was a first creation, followed by a fall from the first creation and a second creation in which the current visible material world was created.

First Creation: The "rational beings" (logikoi) or "minds" (noes) were created. They were united with God as part of "the Unity" (henad).
The great pre-cosmic fall from the First Creation, or "the Movement" (kenesis):  The "rational beings" (logikoi) or "minds" (noes) began to individually fall from "the Unity" (henad), with negligence being the first great sin. The "minds" then turned into "souls" (psyche).
Second Creation: God, in his benevolence, creates the visible current universe by giving bodies to the fallen souls so that they would not lapse into nothingness. The bodies became angels, human beings, and demons. Different elements make up each (Kephalia Gnostika 1.62). Intellect and fire constitute the angels, epithymia (bodily desires) and earth constitute human beings, and thymos (emotions) and air constitute the demons. (See also Plato's theory of soul.)

See also
Enneads
Neoplatonism
Hesychasm
Origenist Crises

Notes

References

External links

Luke Dysinger's translation of the Kephalaia Gnostika, Syriac S2
Luke Dysinger's translation of the Kephalaia Gnostika, Syriac S1

4th-century books
Philosophy books
Metaphysics literature
Christian philosophy
Epistemology literature
Religious philosophical literature